Manuel Bermejo Hernández (26 March 1936 – 22 September 2009) was a Spanish businessman and politician from the Union of the Democratic Centre. He served as member of the first Congress of Deputies representing Cáceres.

References

1936 births
2009 deaths
People from Cáceres, Spain
Presidents of the Regional Government of Extremadura
Members of the 1st Congress of Deputies (Spain)
Union of the Democratic Centre (Spain) politicians